"Just What I Always Wanted" is a song by English singer Mari Wilson, released as a single in 1982. It is from her 1983 debut album Showpeople.

As Wilson's fifth single release, "Just What I Always Wanted" was her first UK top 40 hit, reaching No. 8 in October 1982.

Robin Denselow of The Guardian said of the song: "With 'Just What I Always Wanted', Mari Wilson found the perfect song to fit her image - emotional, slightly camp & sounding as if it might have been a pop hit back in the early 60s. It was tongue-in-cheek but performed with deadpan panache, treated the same way Mari treats her stage uniform with her long gloves, jewellery & enormous beehive hairdo."

Track listing
A. "Just What I Always Wanted" (Teddy Johns)
B1. "Are You There (With Another Girl)" (Bacharach and David)
B2. "Woe, Woe, Woe" (Teddy Johns)

Charts

References

1982 songs
1982 singles
London Records singles
Mari Wilson songs
Song recordings produced by Tony Mansfield